Azya is a genus of lady beetles in the family Coccinellidae. There are about 12 described species in Azya.

Species
These 12 species belong to the genus Azya:

 Azya bioculata Gordon
 Azya elegans Gordon
 Azya exuta Gordon
 Azya ilicis Almeida & Carvalho, 1996
 Azya luteipes Mulsant, 1850
 Azya mexicana Gordon
 Azya mulsanti Gordon
 Azya murilloi Gordon
 Azya orbigera Mulsant, 1850 (globe-marked lady beetle)
 Azya satipoi Gordon
 Azya scutata Mulsant, 1850
 Azya weyrauchi Gordon

References

Further reading

 
 

Coccinellidae
Coccinellidae genera
Articles created by Qbugbot